Hadji Jasper Shia Que is a Filipino politician who is the current mayor of Bongao, Tawi-Tawi. He was elected mayor in 2010. He is also the son of former Bongao mayor Albert Que.

References

Living people
Liberal Party (Philippines) politicians
Mayors of places in Tawi-Tawi
Filipino former Christians
Filipino Muslims 
Year of birth missing (living people)
21st-century Filipino politicians